The 2008 Spanish Formula Three Championship was the eighth Spanish Formula Three Championship season. It commenced on May 3, 2008 and ended on November 2. The Spanish driver Germán Sánchez was crowned champion, two points ahead of runner-up Nelson Panciatici, who was driving an older 'B-class' car. The title was decided in favour of Sánchez and Natacha Gachnang after the resolution of various claims. Panciatici was disqualified for using duct tape on the wings of the car, a common technique in this championship, which does not influence the behavior of the vehicle or guarantee any improvement according to a press release from Hache Team.

Teams and drivers

 All cars are powered by Fiat engines.  Guest drivers in italics.
{|
|

Calendar

Standings

Class A

Points are awarded as follows:

The starting grid of the second race will be based on the results of the first race, but the order of the first six classified may be changed.

Copa F306/300

Team Standings

References

External links
 Official Site

Formula Three season
Euroformula Open Championship seasons
Spanish
Spanish F3